The 1954 Aberdare by-election was a parliamentary by-election held on 28 October 1954 for the British House of Commons constituency of Aberdare in Wales.  The seat had become vacant when the Labour Member of Parliament (MP) David Thomas had died on 20 June 1954. Thomas had held the seat since the 1946 by-election. The Labour candidate, Arthur Probert held the seat for the party. He remained the constituency's MP until his retirement at the February 1974 general election.

Result

References

Aberdare by-election 
Aberdare, 1954
Aberdare by-election 
Aberdare by-election, 1954
History of Rhondda Cynon Taf
Aberdare by-election